Doğandere can refer to:

 Doğandere, Lapseki
 Doğandere, Nallıhan
 Doğandere, Refahiye